Boulengerula is a genus of amphibians in the family Herpelidae. They are found in East Africa. They are sometimes known as Boulenger's caecilians or Usambara bluish-gray caecilians.

Ecology
Boulengerula taitana feeds on earthworms, termites, dipteran larvae and other soil macrofauna. Presumably other Boulengerula have similar diets.

Species 
There are eight species:

References

 
Amphibians of Africa
Amphibian genera
Taxa named by Gustav Tornier
Taxonomy articles created by Polbot